Talas American College (Talas Amerikan Koleji or Talas Amerikan Ortaokulu in Turkish) was a secondary school for boys, located in Talas, Kayseri in Turkey.

History
The college was established in 1871 by US missionary James L. Fowle, and was turned to a secondary boarding school by Henry K. Wingate in 1889. With the completion of a much larger building in 1906, the college consisted of two schools, one for boys and the other for girls in two separate buildings.

After serving the region in education 86 years long and graduating notable alumni, the college was closed down in 1968. The boys' school building is being used by the provincial youth and sports authority since 1976. The building of girls' school, which was used as a hospital in 1911, was left to Erciyes University in 1978.

Notable faculty
Paul Nilson and Harriet Fisher Nilson

Notable alumni
Mete Akyol (1935–2016), Turkish journalist

See also

 List of missionary schools in Turkey
 List of high schools in Turkey

References

External links
Short history in Turkish
Short history on boys and girls schools

High schools in Kayseri
Educational institutions established in 1871
High schools in Turkey
International schools in Turkey
1871 establishments in the Ottoman Empire